The Hunter 31-2 is an American sailboat that was designed by the Hunter Design Team and first built in 2006.

The design was originally marketed by the manufacturer as the Hunter 30 and later as the Hunter 31, but is now usually referred to as the 31-2 or the 30/31 (2005), to differentiate it from the unrelated 1983 Hunter 31 design.  It is also sometimes confused with the 2015 Marlow-Hunter 31. The Hunter 31-2 was also sold as the Hunter 30, causing confusion with the 1973 designed Hunter 30. It is sometimes called the Hunter 30-3.

Production
The design was built by Hunter Marine in the United States between 2006 and 2009, but it is now out of production.

Design

The Hunter 31-2 is a recreational keelboat, built predominantly of fiberglass. It has a fractional sloop B&R rig, a plumb stem, a walk-through reverse transom wit a swimming platform, an internally-mounted spade-type rudder controlled by a wheel and a fixed fin keel with a weighed bulb. It displaces  and carries  of ballast.

Standard equipment supplied included a 110% furling genoa, a chart table, window curtains, a laminate cabin sole, private forward and aft cabins, a two-burner stove, icebox, plates, bowls and mugs, an air horn, anchor and four life jackets. Factory available options included an autopilot, bimini top, air conditioning, spinnaker, microwave oven,  flat panel TV and DVD player, a stereo with CD player and a Marine VHF radio.

See also
List of sailing boat types

Related development
Hunter 31

Similar sailboats
Allmand 31
Beneteau 31
Catalina 310
Corvette 31
Douglas 31
Herreshoff 31
Hunter 310
Niagara 31
Roue 20
Tanzer 31

References

External links

Official factory brochure

Keelboats
2000s sailboat type designs
Sailing yachts
Trailer sailers
Sailboat type designs by Hunter Design Team
Sailboat types built by Hunter Marine